The 2022–23 Morgan State Bears men's basketball team represented Morgan State University in the 2022–23 NCAA Division I men's basketball season. The Bears, led by fourth-year head coach Kevin Broadus, played their home games at Talmadge L. Hill Field House in Baltimore, Maryland as members of the Mid-Eastern Athletic Conference.

Previous season
The Bears finished the 2021–22 season 13–15, 7–6 in MEAC play to finish in fourth place. In the MEAC tournament, they defeated South Carolina State in the quarterfinals, but lost to Norfolk State in the semifinals.

Roster

Schedule and results

|-
!colspan=12 style=| Non-conference regular season

|-
!colspan=12 style=| MEAC regular season

|-
!colspan=9 style=| MEAC tournament

Sources

References

Morgan State Bears men's basketball seasons
Morgan State Bears
Morgan State Bears men's basketball
Morgan State Bears men's basketball